Kiko or KIKO may refer to:

People
Kiko (given name), a list of individuals with the name
Kiko Pangilinan (born 1963), Filipino senator and farmer
Kiko, Princess Akishino (born 1966), the wife of Prince Fumihito
Kiko (footballer, born 1972), Spanish footballer
Kiko Charana (born 1976), Portuguese footballer
Kiko (footballer, born 1978), Brazilian footballer
Kheireddine "Kiko" Zarabi (born 1984), Algerian footballe
Kiko (footballer, born 1988), Spanish footballer
Kiko (footballer, born 1993), Portuguese footballer
Kiko (footballer, born 1998), Andorran footballer
Kiko (footballer, born 2002), Francisco Miguel Teixeira Domingues, Portuguese football left-back for Benfica B

Other uses
Kikō, the Japanese form of the Chinese term qigong
Kiko (album), by Los Lobos
Kiko (TV series), a children's animated series
Kiko goat, a breed of goat from New Zealand
KIKO (AM), a radio station (1340 AM) licensed to Apache Junction, Arizona, United States
KIKO-FM, a radio station (96.5 FM) licensed to Claypool, Arizona, United States
Kikō-ji, a Buddhist temple in Nara, Japan

See also
Keiko (disambiguation)
Kikos (disambiguation)
Quico (disambiguation)
Tropical Storm Kiko (disambiguation), hurricanes, typhoons and a tropical storm